Joseph F. Wagner (born May 7, 1960 in Springfield, Massachusetts) is an American politician who represents the 8th Hampden District in the Massachusetts House of Representatives. Prior to becoming a state representative, Wagner was the administrative assistant to mayor of Chicopee.

Early life and education
Wagner was born in Springfield, Massachusetts and attended Cathedral High School and later attended Western New England University.

Professional life
Wagner worked as the administrative aid to the Mayor of Chicopee, Massachusetts from 1988 until 1991.

See also
 2019–2020 Massachusetts legislature
 2021–2022 Massachusetts legislature

References

Notes
1.Sometimes erroneously referred to as Majority Whip.

1960 births
Politicians from Springfield, Massachusetts
Democratic Party members of the Massachusetts House of Representatives
Western New England University alumni
University of Massachusetts Amherst alumni
Living people
People from Chicopee, Massachusetts
21st-century American politicians